Thomas Vincensini (born 12 September 1993) is a French professional footballer who plays as a goalkeeper for Belgian club Virton.

Club career
On 12 July 2022, Vincensini's contract with Bastia was terminated by mutual consent.

On 15 July 2022, he moved to Virton in Belgium.

References

External links
 

1993 births
Living people
French footballers
Association football goalkeepers
Corsica international footballers
Ligue 1 players
Ligue 2 players
Championnat National players
SC Bastia players
FC Bastia-Borgo players
Valenciennes FC players
RC Lens players
R.E. Virton players
Footballers from Corsica
French expatriate footballers
Expatriate footballers in Belgium
French expatriate sportspeople in Belgium